François Bégaudeau (born 27 April 1971) is a French writer, journalist, and actor. He is best known for co-writing and starring in Entre les murs (2008), a film based on his 2006 novel of the same name. The film won the Palme d'Or at the 2008 Cannes Film Festival and received an Academy Award nomination for Best Foreign Language Film in 2009.

Early life
He was born in Luçon, Vendée, France and was a member of the 1990s punk rock group Zabriskie Point. After receiving his degree in Literature, he taught high school in Dreux and in an inner city middle school in Paris.

Career 
Bégaudeau published his first novel, Jouer juste in 2003. In 2005, he published Dans la diagonale and Un démocrate, Mick Jagger 1960-1969, a fictionalized account of the life of Mick Jagger. In 2006, his third novel entitled Entre les murs earned him the Prix France Culture/Télérama.

Bégaudeau works as a movie critic for the French version of Playboy, having previously worked for the Cahiers du cinéma. He was also a regular contributor for several French magazines, including Inculte, Transfuge and So Foot. Since 2006, he has been a columnist for La Matinale and Le Cercle on Canal+ television.

He worked on the screenplay for Entre les murs (2008), a film based on his 2006 novel of the same name, in collaboration with the film's director Laurent Cantet. Bégaudeau also starred as the lead in the film, which went on to win the Palme d'Or at the 2008 Cannes Film Festival. The film also earned an Academy Award nomination for Best Foreign Language Film in 2009, though it ultimately lost to Japan's Departures. The English-language version of Entre les murs was published in April 2009 by Seven Stories Press under the title The Class.

Works
 Jouer juste, Éditions Verticales, 2003
 Dans la diagonale, Éditions Verticales, 2005
 Un démocrate : Mick Jagger 1960-1969, Naïve Records, 2005
 Entre les murs, Éditions Verticales, 2006
 Collaboration for Débuter dans l'enseignement : Témoignages d'enseignants, conseils d'experts, ESF, 2006
 Collaboration  for Devenirs du roman, Naïve Records, 2007
 Collaboration for Une année en France : Réferendum/banlieues/CPE, Gallimard, 2007
 Fin de l'histoire, Éditions Verticales, 2007
 Vers la Douceur, Éditions Verticales, 2009
 Histoire de ta bêtise, Éditions Fayard/Pauvert, 2019
 Notre Joie, Éditions Fayard/Pauvert, 2021

References

External links
 Official site with photos and videos of François Bégaudeau
 Short biography with a photo of François Bégaudeau in French
 Interview with François Bégaudeau

1971 births
Living people
People from Luçon
21st-century French non-fiction writers
French male film actors
French film critics
French male non-fiction writers